Song Wo ( 926 –  989), also known as Song Yanwo, was a military officer and general who successively served the Later Jin, Later Han, Later Zhou, and Song dynasties. He was a grandson of Later Tang's founding emperor Li Cunxu, a son-in-law of Later Han's founding emperor Liu Zhiyuan, and (through his daughter Empress Song) the father-in-law of Song dynasty's founding emperor Zhao Kuangyin.

References
 

10th-century Chinese people
920s births
989 deaths